Walter Lee Hawkins (May 18, 1949 – July 11, 2010) was an American gospel singer, songwriter, composer, and pastor. An influential figure in urban contemporary gospel music, his career spanned more than four decades. He was consecrated to the bishopric in 2000.

Biography
The 7th of 8 children born to the late Dan Lee and Mamie Vivian Hawkins, Walter Lee Hawkins was born on May 18, 1949, in Oakland, California. Hawkins was the brother of Edwin Hawkins (d. 2018), Marava Ladale Hawkins (d. 1988), Carol Lee Hawkins (d. 2020), Feddie Joyce Hawkins, Jervis Ersell Hawkins (d. 1952), Daniel Lee Hawkins (Marcia) and Lynette Gail Hawkins-Stephens (Reginald). Bishop Hawkins was married to Tramaine Hawkins from 1971 until their divorce in 1994. They had two children, a son Walter Lee "Jamie" Hawkins, Jr., who is married to Myiia "Sunny" Davis-Hawkins, and a daughter Trystan Lynette Hawkins. Bishop Hawkins also had a granddaughter, Jahve Neru Deana Hawkins, and a grandson, Jamie Daniel Hawkins.

Bishop Hawkins started his career in one of his brother's chorales, the Northern California State Youth Choir of the Church of God in Christ. The choir recorded an album in 1968 as a local fundraiser. When a song from that album, "Oh Happy Day", became a crossover hit, Buddah Records purchased the master and released it as "the Edwin Hawkins Singers". This led to him accompanying his brother Edwin to establish the Edwin Hawkins Singers.

Walter Hawkins left the Edwin Hawkins Singers in the early 1970s to establish the Love Center Church in Oakland, California. He and his Love Center Choir had considerable success with their Love Alive series of recordings, which sold well over a million copies from the 1970s through the 1990s. Love Alive IV, released in 1990, was No. 1 on the Billboard Gospel Album charts, where it stayed for 33 weeks. In all, Walter Hawkins produced and/or collaborated on 116 hit songs which were listed on the Billboard Gospel Music charts.

Walter Hawkins and his groups were frequent musical collaborators, and recorded with Van Morrison, Diahann Carroll, Sylvester, and Jeffrey Osborne, among many others.

One of those who regularly attended the Love Center church was Sylvester, who had been introduced to it in the early 1980s by Jeanie Tracy.

Death
On July 11, 2010, Walter Hawkins died of pancreatic cancer at the age of 61 in his house in Ripon, California.

Discography

Albums
1972: Selah (Fantasy)
1972: Do Your Best (solo album)
1975: Love Alive – Love Center Choir (Light)
1977: Jesus Christ Is the Way – The Hawkins Family (Light)
1978: Love Alive 2 – Love Center Choir (Light)
1980: The Hawkins Family (Light)
1982: Gospel (Savoy)
1982: I Feel Like Singing (Light)
1984: Love Alive 3 – Love Center Choir (Light)
1988: Special Gift Hawkins Family (Birthright)
1989: Love Alive Reunion (Light)
1990: Love Alive 4 – Love Center Choir (Malaco)
1996: New Dawning – Hawkins Family (Bellmark)
1998: Love Alive, Vol. 5: 25th Anniversary Reunion – Love Center Choir (Interscope)
2000: Take Courage – Hawkins Family (Bellmark)
2005: A Song in My Heart (solo) (Coda/Red-Sony)

Compilation albums
1990: Only The Best (Light)
1995: Light Years (Light)
1995: The Hawkins Family Collection (Platinum)
2002: The Best of Love Alive (Light)
2002: Legends of Gospel (Light)
2002: Mega 3 Collection: Love Alive (Light)
2005: The Very Best of Walter Hawkins and the Hawkins Family (Artemis Gospel)

Appearances on other albums
1975: This Moment – Danniebelle
1976: David Soul – David Soul
1980: The Lord's Prayer – Various artists; duet with Tramaine Hawkins on "Thy Kingdom Come" (Light)
1982: Imagine Heaven – The Edwin Hawkins Singers
1982: This Is Love – Patrick Henderson (keyboards)
1983: I'm On Your Side – Angela Bofill
1986: The Search Is Over – Tramaine Hawkins
1986: I Must Go On – Shirley Miller (producer, writer, vocals)
1986: Hand in Hand – The Williams Brothers (producer, keyboards)
1986: Just Daryl – Daryl Coley (background vocals, keyboards)
1986: Frantic Romantic – Jermaine Stewart (background vocals) 
1987: The Hunger – Michael Bolton (background vocals)
1987: Touch the World – Earth, Wind & Fire
1987: Baby Sis – Lynette Hawkins Stephens (producer, writer, vocals)
1990: Face to Face – Edwin Hawkins
1990: Live – Tramaine Hawkins (producer, choir director, keyboards)
1991: Gospel Music Workshop of America1991: Gentlemen of Gospel, Vol. 2
1992: A Salute to The Caravans – Various artists (performer on "Where Is Your Faith in God")
1993: It Remains to Be Seen – The Mississippi Mass Choir (producer)
1993: Hold on Old Soldier – The Mississippi Mass Choir (producer, writer, singer)
1994: Choirs En Masse – Various artists (performer, producer)
1994: Job – Bay Area Mass Choir
1995: On & On – Jennifer Holliday (producer, background vocals, piano)
1996: Music in Me – Larry Coleman (producer)
1996: "I'll See You In The Rapture" Mississippi Mass Choir
1996: Be Encouraged – Los Angeles Chapter of the G.M.W.A.
1997: Jesus Loves Me – The Western Michigan Mass Choir
1997: Leaning on Jesus – Cogic International Mass Choir
1997: Live Gospel Experience, Vol. 3 – Various artists
1997: Live Gospel Experience, Vol. 4 – Various artists
1997: Keepers – Merl Saunders & Friends (background vocals)
1998: Love Is the Only Way – Edwin Hawkins
1998: I Get Lifted – Kelli Williams (producer, keyboards)
1998: Unconditional Love – Darlene Love
1999: World Class Gospel Experience, Vol. 1 – Various artists
2002: Go Get Your Life Back – Donald Lawrence
2005: Get Thee Behind Me – Sacramento Metropolitan GMWA
2005: Journey-Live in NY – Richard Smallwood
2006: Praise & Worship – Daryl Coley (producer)
2006: Finale Act I, Finale Act II & The Grand Finale by Donald Lawrence and The Tri-City Singers
2008: The Sound – Mary Mary
2010: The Gospel Music Celebration: Tribute to Bishop G.E. Patterson – Various artists ("What is This")
2010: The Gospel Music Celebration, Pt. 2: Tribute To Bishop G.E. Patterson – Various artists ("I Love You, Lord")

Video
1982: Gospel 
1983: Oh Happy Day 
1991: Love Alive, Vol. 4 (Malaco)
1998: Walter Hawkins & The Hawkins Family (Monterey Video)
1998: Love Alive, Vol. 5: 25th Anniversary Reunion, Vol. 1 (Interscope)
1999: Love Alive, Vol. 5: 25th Anniversary Reunion, Vol. 2 (Interscope)
2006: Song in My Heart (Coda)

Awards
Hawkins was nominated for nine Grammy Awards, and won the 1981 Grammy for Best Gospel Performance, Contemporary or Inspirational for the special project album The Lord's Prayer.

Hawkins won three Gospel Music Association Dove Awards:
1980: Soul Gospel Album of the Year for Love Alive II; Walter Hawkins and the Love Center Choir
1982: Contemporary Gospel Album of the Year for The Hawkins Family Live1991: Traditional Song of the Year for "The Potter's House" (co-songwriter)

He won two Stellar Awards:
2006: Traditional Male Vocalist of the Year 
2006: Traditional CD of the Year for A Song in My Heart''

References

External links
 
 Walter Hawkins biography at the Love Center website accessed July 12, 2010
 Walter Hawkins on the Billboard music charts accessed July 12, 2010
  Walter Hawkins death notice | Music inside

1949 births
2010 deaths
Musicians from Oakland, California
American Pentecostals
Church of God in Christ pastors
African-American musicians
Deaths from pancreatic cancer
American bishops
American gospel singers
Grammy Award winners
Deaths from cancer in California
Singers from California